The Changsha Metro (officially ; also called ) is a rapid transit system in Changsha, the capital city of Hunan province in China. The first operational line, Line 2, commenced service on April 29, 2014, making Changsha the 18th city in mainland China to open a rapid transit system.

Lines in operation

Line 1 

Line 1 construction began in 2010 and was opened on June 28, 2016. The construction budget was 14.2 billion RMB. A  extension to Line 1 is under construction, adding 5 stations north of its current terminal at Kaifu District Government; it will open to the public in 2022. Line 1 is colored  on system maps.

Line 2 

Line 2 is a line running from west to east Changsha. It was opened on April 29, 2014 and extended in December 2015. Line 2 is colored  on system maps.

Line 3 

Line 3 started construction on January 3, 2014. The line opened on 28 June 2020. It line travels between Shantang station and Guangsheng station. Line 3 is colored  on system maps.

Line 4 

Line 4 started construction on December 31, 2014. The line opened on 26 May 2019 with 25 stations.
The line travels between Guanziling station and Dujiaping station. Line 4 is colored  on system maps.

Line 5 

Line 5 started construction in 2015. The line opened on 28 June 2020. It travels between Maozhutang station and Shuiduhe station. Line 5 is colored  on system maps.

Line 6

Line 6 opened on 28 June 2022. It runs in an east-west direction, connecting the airport with the downtown. The middle section of Line 6 started construction on November 28, 2017. The  western section, with 4 more stations, and the  eastern section with 7 more stations, are scheduled for completion in 2022. It will travel between Shaoguang station and Changqing station. Line 6 is colored  on system maps.

Future development

Short-term expansions

See also
Changsha Maglev
Changde–Yiyang–Changsha high-speed railway
Changsha–Zhuzhou–Xiangtan intercity railway
Urban rail transit in China
List of metro systems

References

 
Rail transport in Hunan
Rapid transit in China
Transport in Changsha
Transport infrastructure under construction in China